Timothy James White (November 1, 1974April 1, 2010) was an American man who was abducted in 1980 by pedophile Kenneth Parnell, and held a few weeks before he was rescued by fellow child captive, 14-year-old Steven Stayner, who escaped and guided the 5-year-old to safety.

Kidnapping 
Seven years prior to White's kidnapping, Parnell kidnapped seven-year-old Steven Stayner as he walked home from school. As Stayner aged, Parnell lost interest in him and was motivated to kidnap another younger boy. Parnell enlisted Stayner as an accomplice in a few earlier kidnappings which failed due to Stayner failing to follow directions (Stayner later admitted he intentionally sabotaged the aborted kidnappings in order to spare other children his fate). Thinking Stayner was an incompetent criminal, Parnell cajoled one of Stayner's teenage friends, a local boy named Sean Poorman, into being an accomplice, promising him drugs and money.

On February 13, 1980, Poorman noticed 5-year-old Timmy White, who was playing outside his parents' house in Ukiah, California and ushered him into Parnell's getaway car. When White refused and attempted to run indoors, Poorman shoved the boy against a chain link fence, forced him to loosen his grip, then dragged him kicking and screaming into the car. Parnell made quick work in brainwashing White, as he had done with Stayner's abduction, repeatedly trying to get White to think his new name was "Tommy". Parnell paid off Poorman with the promised cash and marijuana, then ordered him to leave and never speak of the incident. Parnell also dyed Timmy White's blond hair dark brown in order to mask his appearance from the forthcoming missing child posters. Ultimately Parnell would pass White off as his younger son and Stayner's brother. White forged a bond with Stayner during the 16 days he was held captive and spoke favorably of how the older boy took care of him. Stayner, determined to not see another child suffer the systematic sexual abuse that he endured, sought to return White to his parents.

Escape 
On March 1, 1980, Stayner and White escaped while Parnell was at work. Parnell lived in remote backcountry; they walked a quarter of a mile down a road until a passing truck driver took them to Ukiah. White was able to direct the driver to a babysitter's house, but no one was home. Since White couldn't recall where his parents lived, Stayner went to a phone booth and found the address of the Ukiah police station. At the station, Stayner told White to walk inside and tell them who he was. White approached the door, but got scared and ran back to Stayner. Officers observed this, stopped the boys from leaving, and soon learned their identities.

Parnell was convicted of abducting Stayner and White in separate trials. He was sentenced to seven years for the kidnapping of White, and seven months for kidnapping Stayner, and was paroled after five years. Parnell was not charged with sexual assaulting Stayner because those offenses had occurred in another county and were outside the jurisdiction of the Merced County prosecutor. Authorities were satisfied that White had not been sexually assaulted.

The White family maintained contact with the Stayners, and when Stayner died in a motorcycle accident in 1989, a then 14-year-old White was a pallbearer.

Later life and death 
White became a Los Angeles County Sheriff's Department Deputy in 2005. Like Stayner, he gave lectures to children about his experience and the dangers of kidnapping. In 2004, Parnell was tried for human trafficking and attempting to kidnap a child, and White was summoned to testify. Also summoned was a full-grown Sean Poorman, who reacted with shock, not having seen White since the 1980 kidnapping. The two spoke briefly and hugged, White having forgiven Poorman.

White married his wife Dena and had two children.

He died on April 1, 2010, from a pulmonary embolism.

On August 28, 2010, a statue of White and Stayner was dedicated in Applegate Park in Merced. Residents of Ukiah also erected a statue representing White and Stayner escaping hand in hand.

See also 
List of kidnappings
List of solved missing person cases

References

Further reading

External links 

Kenneth Parnell and a chronology of his crimes

1974 births
1980s missing person cases
2010 deaths
American deputy sheriffs
Deaths from pulmonary embolism
Formerly missing people
Kidnapped American children
Incidents of violence against boys
Missing person cases in California
Violence against men in North America